Army Recruit Training Centre (ARTC) is the official name given to the Australian Army's basic training establishment since 1 December 1998. Situated at Kapooka, an outer suburb of Wagga Wagga, in the Riverina region of New South Wales, the Army Recruit Training Centre (ARTC) is located within Blamey Barracks, about 9.5 km south-west of Wagga Wagga.

Blamey Barracks is named after Field Marshal Sir Thomas Blamey, an Australian general of the Second World War who was born near Wagga Wagga. He was the first, and to date only, Australian to attain the rank of field marshal.

History
The site that was to become ARTC was established on a property on the southern slopes of the Pomingalarna Reserve in 1942 as a direct result of defence needs during the Second World War. As a part of the Royal Australian Engineers Centre thousands of engineers were trained in basic soldiering skills as well as engineering duties. In addition 47,000 regular soldiers also trained at the barracks from 1942 to 1945. The location was also the camp for members of the Australian Women's Army Service who acted as orderlies, drivers and hospital staff during that period of time.

On 24 May 1945 at a little after 3 pm, 26 men were killed in an accident on the base. 24 trainees were assembling hand held explosive devices under the supervision of training staff when a large explosion occurred. There was only one survivor of the group. The cause of the explosion has never been determined. The incident led to Australia's largest military funeral.

Following the Second World War the barracks became the 1st Recruit Training Battalion (1RTB) which was established in November 1951 with Lieutenant Colonel V.E. Dowdy appointed as the first Commanding Officer. During 1952 and 1953, 1RTB was joined by 2nd Recruit Training Battalion in temporary buildings on the ridge south of the main camp.

Most of the current facilities were constructed during 1965 and 1966 and officially opened on 6 December 1966 by the then Governor of New South Wales, Sir Roden Cutler. 1RTB conducted training for both national service and regular Army recruits, and during the Vietnam War between 1965 and 1972, in excess of 10,000 National Service men trained at Kapooka.

In 1985, the ARTC (then called 1RTB) became responsible for the training of female recruits, who were previously trained at WRAAC School at Georges Heights in Sydney. The centre took on the additional responsibility of training some reserve recruits from 1993.

The Army Adventurous Training Wing moved from Bonegilla, Victoria to the Blamey Barracks in 1998. In October 2006, Recruit Training Wing formally changed its name back to the 1st Recruit Training Battalion (1RTB).

Current structure and programs
ARTC has two training wings, Recruit Training Wing (RTW) that provides initial recruit training for all regular and reserve recruits for the Army, and the Army Adventurous Training Wing that trains unit adventurous training leaders.

Reserve recruits currently undertake a 35-day program whilst the recruits that are to form part of the Australian Regular Army undertake an 80-day program. The course consists of various components including marksmanship training, physical training, navigation, drill, dress and bearing, first aid, radio communications, military customs and traditions, service discipline law, and field training.

There are 5 companies within the battalion, Alpha (1-6 Platoon), Bravo (11-16 Platoon), Charlie (21-26 Platoon), Delta (31-36 Platoon), and Echo (41-46 Platoon), which a recruit will join one of the platoons within a company when they arrive at 1RTB. Occasionally, a platoon may be paired with a sister platoon or two from the same company, depending on the size of the intake, and will march in and march out at the same time as the other platoons as each platoon has a max compacity of 60 recruits. As of mid 2021, Delta was temporarily disbanded, to comply with COVID-19 government guidelines, and every third reservist intake were isolated from the rest of the battalion and placed into Camp Blue Training Grounds, just above the rifle ranges. Currently, the battalion is led by COL Andrew Deacon, who is currently the youngest commander in 1RTB history, at age 38. 

ARTC is also home to Australian Army Band Kapooka, which is part of the army's Australian Army Band Corps. It provides music for military ceremonies.

Notes

References

Wagga Wagga
Australian Army bases
Buildings of the Australian government
Military education and training in Australia